From the opening of Flamengo's football department in 1912 up until 1920 the club had no official head coach. The job of commanding the professional team consisted in a Ground Committee usually improvised, composed by the team captains and club directors. In 1920 the club has its first solo head coach, the Uruguayan Ramón Platero, only lasting for 9 matches. The Ground Committee appeared again in 1923, this time in its last appearance.

Flamengo had a total of 82 different head coaches from 9 different nationalities in 141 spells during the 111 years of its football department history.

Head coaches
The following is a list of Clube de Regatas do Flamengo head coaches.

P = Matches played; W = Matches won; D = Matches drawn; L = Matches lost; GF = Goals for; GA = Goals against

By nationality

Trophies

References

External links
Clube de Regatas do Flamengo (Official website)
 

Flamengo
Managers